Syrup is a thick, viscous liquid, containing a large amount of dissolved sugars, but showing little tendency to deposit crystals.

Syrup may also refer to:

 Syrup (drug), slang for Purple drank, a recreational drug
 Syrup (novel), a satirical novel by Max Barry
 Syrup (film), a film based on the novel by Barry
 Cough medicine, also known as cough syrup
 Sirup (film), a Danish 1990 drama film

People with the surname
 Friedrich Syrup (1881–1945), German jurist and politician

See also